Harald Vilimsky (born 22 July 1966) is an Austrian politician and Member of the European Parliament (MEP) from Austria. He is a member of the Freedom Party of Austria, part of the Identity and Democracy Party.

Personal life
He is married and has a daughter.

References

External links
 

1966 births
Living people
20th-century Austrian politicians
21st-century Austrian politicians
Politicians from Vienna
Austrian people of Czech descent
Freedom Party of Austria MEPs
MEPs for Austria 2014–2019
MEPs for Austria 2019–2024